András Bálint (born 26 April 1943) is a Hungarian actor. He has appeared in more than 75 films and television shows since 1958.

Selected filmography
 Father (1966)
 The Confrontation (1969)
 Szerelmesfilm (1970)
 Trotta (1971)
 141 Minutes from the Unfinished Sentence (1975)
 Budapest Tales (1976)
 Colonel Redl (1985)
 The Red Countess (1985)
 Season of Monsters (1987)
 Jesus Christ's Horoscope (1989)
 Stalin (1992)
 An American Girl: Grace Stirs Up Success (2015)

References

External links

1943 births
Living people
Hungarian male film actors
People from Pécs